Pueyrredón is a French surname. It originated in the 13th century. Initial variants were Puyredón, Puiredón, Puecheredón and Puitredón.

Etymology 
The name comes from "Podium Rotundum". "Puy" ("podium" in Latin) means mountain or hill, and "redón" means round. So, Pueyrredón" becomes "rounded hill". It was used at the Languedoc to name "puy" (podium) any lonely mountain. Such structures were strategically useful for as castle sites, many royal family names included "Puy". Neither the family nor their contemporaries wrote the surname with an acute accent on the o. Nevertheless, current grammatical rules mandate the stress mark.

Notables 
Juan Martín de Pueyrredón is a noted member of the Pueyrredón family of Buenos Aires.

Bibliography
 

Surnames
French-language surnames